Peter Buysrogge (born 1976) is a Belgian politician and a member of the Member of the Chamber of Representatives for the New Flemish Alliance party since 2014.

Buysrogge studied political science at Ghent University and worked as a secretary to former N-VA leader Geert Bourgeois. He has also served as an alderman for the city of Sint-Niklaas. In the federal elections of 2014, he was elected a member of the Chamber of Representatives. He was re-elected to the House in the elections of May 2019. After these elections he became chairman of the Parliamentary Defense Committee.

References 

Living people
1976 births
21st-century Belgian politicians
People from Sint-Niklaas
New Flemish Alliance politicians
Members of the Chamber of Representatives (Belgium)
Ghent University alumni
Belgian city councillors
Belgian deputies of the 55th legislature